The following Union Army units and commanders fought in the Battle of Corinth of the American Civil War on October 3 and 4, 1862, in Corinth, Mississippi. Order of battle compiled from the army organization, return of casualtiesand reports. The Confederate order of battle is listed separately.

Abbreviations used

Military rank
 MG = Major General
 BG = Brigadier General
 Col = Colonel
 Ltc = Lieutenant Colonel
 Maj = Major
 Cpt = Captain
 Lt = Lieutenant

Other
 w = wounded
 mw = mortally wounded
 k = killed
 c = captured

Army of the Mississippi

MG William S. Rosecrans

Chief of Staff: Ltc Henry Gassaway Kennett
Aide de Camp: Col John V. Du Bois

Army of the Tennessee

MG Ulysses S. Grant (not present)
Detachment commanded by BG James B. McPherson

Notes

References

 Eicher, John H., and David J. Eicher. Civil War High Commands. Stanford, CA: Stanford University Press, 2001. .

American Civil War orders of battle